Pol Valentín Sancho (born 21 February 1997) is a Spanish professional footballer who plays for Sporting Gijón as a right back.

Club career
Born in Avinyonet de Puigventós, Girona, Catalonia, Valentín represented UE Figueres as a youth. On 6 December 2014, aged 17, he made his first team debut by coming on as a late substitute in a 1–0 Tercera División away win against FC Vilafranca.

On 3 July 2015, Valentín signed a three-year deal with Gimnàstic de Tarragona, returning to youth football. He was promoted to the farm team ahead of the 2016–17 season, and scored his first senior goal on 28 August 2016 in a 1–4 loss at Palamós CF; he was also sent off during the match.

Valentín was called up to the 2017 pre-season of the first team by new manager Lluís Carreras, being promoted in late July mainly as Otar Kakabadze's backup. On 7 August of that year, he renewed his contract until 2020.

Valentín made his professional debut on 13 January 2018, starting in a 1–1 away draw against UD Almería in the Segunda División. He was definitely promoted for the main squad for the 2018–19 season, which ended in relegation.

On 31 January 2020, Valentín was transferred to Valencia CF, being assigned to the reserves also in the third division. On 29 August, he returned to the second tier after agreeing to a two-year contract with CF Fuenlabrada.

Personal life
Valentín's elder brother, Gerard, is also a footballer and a right back. He was also groomed at Figueres. Their father Albert was also a right back, and also played for Figueres.

References

External links

1997 births
Living people
People from Alt Empordà
Sportspeople from the Province of Girona
Spanish footballers
Footballers from Catalonia
Association football defenders
Segunda División players
Tercera División players
UE Figueres footballers
CF Pobla de Mafumet footballers
Gimnàstic de Tarragona footballers
Valencia CF Mestalla footballers
CF Fuenlabrada footballers